Tan Hong Boen (1905–1984), commonly known by his pen name Im Yang Tjoe, was a Chinese Indonesian writer, journalist and translator active in the Dutch East Indies and Indonesia from the 1920s to the 1950s. He also published occasionally under the pen names Madame D'Eden Lovely for romantic novels, Kihadjar Dharmopralojo for historical novels and Kihadjar Soekowijono for Wayang stories. In 1933 he published a biography of Sukarno, who he had shared a jail cell with in 1932; it seems to be the earliest known biography of Sukarno.

Biography
Tan Hong Boen was born on 27 February 1905 in Slawi, Tegal Regency, Central Java, Dutch East Indies. He came from a wealthy family; his father was the owner of a tea plantation. He apparently didn't have much formal education, possibly enrolling in a European school for a few years; he wrote in Malay but was also literate in Javanese, Chinese, Dutch and English.

Because of his interest in the Javanese language and culture, his works of fiction were often adaptations of Javanese stories or settings, although his original works were often set in the Peranakan Chinese community as well. He also traveled around Java and Bali by bicycle to seek inspiration for new stories. He became known for his gift in telling stories in a clever vernacular style, and some of his short stories printed in Sin Po Weekly and other publications won awards. His first novel seems to have been , published in 1925 in the literary journal Penghidoepan.

In 1932 he was arrested and imprisoned after breaking the Indies' strict censorship laws in his journalism and fiction. By chance, he was put in the same jail cell in Bandung as Sukarno, the future first president of Indonesia. He interviewed him in prison, and in 1933 published what seems to be the earliest known biography of Sukarno based on what he had learned. He also published a three-volume who's-who of Chinese notables from Java in 1935, a work which contains some priceless information found nowhere else, but is also organized geographically and can be difficult to navigate. Out of the dozens of books he published, this seems to be the only one he printed under his real name and not a pseudonym.

His stories and novels during this time tended to be less critical of the government and focused more on immoral characters or mystical figures from Javanese folklore. After 1950 he mostly stopped writing novels and turned to writing or adapting stories for Wayang (shadow puppet) performances under the pseudonym Ki Hajar Sukowiyono.

In the postwar era he created a Jamu-inspired health product called  (our pill); he claimed to have thought of the recipe while meditating. It became very successful, especially among long-distance truckers, and is still sold in the 21st century as Pilkita.

He spent his final years in Slawi, mostly interested in Wayang and running his  factory. He died on 15 September 1983 in Slawi.

Selected works
  (1925, as Im Yang Tjoe, novel printed in )
  (1928, as Im Yang Tjoe, novel printed in 2 volumes of )
  (1929, as Madame D'Eden Lovely, romance novel printed in )
  (1929, as Im Yang Tjoe, satirical novel printed in )
  (1930, as Im Yang Tjoe, satirical novel printed in )
  (1933, biography of Sukarno published by Ravena in Surakarta)
  (1935, biographical lexicon of the Chinese community in Java, printed by The Biographical Publishing Centre in Surakarta)
  (1949, as Im Yang Tjoe, novel published in )
  (1953, book about a famous Chinese mystic in Java printed by Palma in Surabaya)

References

1905 births
1983 deaths
Indonesian people of Chinese descent
20th-century Chinese translators
20th-century Indonesian writers
20th-century Chinese novelists
Indonesian translators
People from Slawi
Indonesian journalists
Journalists from the Dutch East Indies